was king of Ryukyu Kingdom who ruled from 1444 to 1449. Shō Shitatsu was the eldest son of king Shō Chū.

He died in 1449 without an heir and his uncle Shō Kinpuku was installed as the king.

References

Chūzan Seifu(中山世譜)

Kings of Ryūkyū
First Shō dynasty
1408 births
1449 deaths